Andy Park is a musician, worship leader and author who is associated with Vineyard Music. He was born in 1957 in Los Angeles, California. He studied at UCLA, earning a bachelor of arts.

After serving as an intern pastor in two Southern California Vineyards – West Los Angeles and Santa Barbara - he moved to British Columbia and joined the Langley Vineyard church plant at its inception in 1985. He served on the staff there for four years as an assistant pastor, majoring in worship music ministry.

Park began recording with Vineyard Music in the late 1980s. He has participated on many Vineyard recordings. In 1990, Park released his first solo project, I saw Heaven. In 2006, Park released another solo studio project, Unshakable, through ION Records (ionworship.org).

Park has been to many countries to minister including Redeemed Christian Church of God, Corner Stone Parish, Okota, Lagos, Nigeria.

Park and his wife live in Surrey, British Columbia, Canada and are the parents of eight children. As well is one of the members of Compassionart a charity founded by Martin Smith from Delirious?.

Discography

Vineyard albums
 Holiness Unto The Lord
 Take Our Lives
 Devoted To You
 The River Is Here
 Blessed Be The Name
 Eternity-Acoustic Worship series
 Name Above All
 Change Me On the Inside- Vineyard Canada Compilation
 All I Need
 Free to Fly
 Winds of Worship 1
 Winds of Worship 2
 Winds of Worship 4: Live from Brighton England
 Winds of Worship 6: Live from Southern California
 Winds of Worship 7: Live from Brownsville
 Winds of Worship 9: Live from Sweden
 Winds of Worship 11: Live from Australia
 Winds of Worship 15: Live from Canada

Solo albums
 I Saw Heaven (1990)
 Night and Day (2001)
 In the Secret (2004)
 Unshakable (2007)
 Wonder Working God (2009)
 Breath of Heaven (2015)
 Still Shining (2016)
 Let Him Love You (2020)

Bibliography
Park, A., To Know You More: Cultivating the heart of a worshipper, InterVarsity Press, 2002.

External links
 
 ION Records website

Date of birth missing (living people)
1957 births
Living people
American emigrants to Canada
Musicians from Los Angeles
Association of Vineyard Churches
Canadian performers of Christian music
Performers of contemporary worship music
Musicians from British Columbia